The men's 50 kilometres walk was the longer of the two men's race walking events on the Athletics at the 1964 Summer Olympics program in Tokyo, as well as the longest event on the program.  It was held on 18 October 1964.  39 athletes from 20 nations entered, with 34 starting and 31 finishing.

Results

12 walkers beat the old Olympic record.

References

Athletics at the 1964 Summer Olympics
Racewalking at the Olympics
Men's events at the 1964 Summer Olympics